A. L. Azhagappan (born 18 September 1951), credited as such, is an Indian actor and filmmaker in Tamil cinema. After making films he has made a career appearing in supporting roles as an actor. His sons A. L. Vijay and Udhaya also work in the film industry.

Career
He was appointed President of Tamil Nadu Producers Council in 2004, and controversially threatened to sue television network Sun TV for showing clips of films. Azhagappan's work was halted in June 2006. when he was arrested in a cheating case for failing to return money to a financier Vishal Jain regarding a film that never began production. The arrest was considered highly political as a result of Azhagappan's declining relationship with the then political supremo Karunanidhi.

Since 2010, Azhagappan has also worked in film as a supporting actor, notably winning award nominations for his negative role in M. Sasikumar's Easan (2010)

Filmography

As actor

As producer

 Ini Ellam Sugame (1998)
Kalakalappu (2001)
Saivam (2014)
Idhu Enna Maayam (2015)
Oru Naal Iravil (2016)
Sometimes (2017)
Vanamagan (2017)

References

External links
 

Living people
21st-century Indian male actors
Male actors in Tamil cinema
Tamil film producers
1951 births